Kaniyooru, also spelled Kaniyooru is a village in Puttur taluk in Dakshina Kannada district of Karnataka state, India. It houses one of the Ashta Mathas established by Madhvacharya, the Dvaita philosopher. The village is located on Mangalore to Bangalore broadguage railway line. There is a railway station at Kaniyooru. The railway station of Kaniyooru  can be accessed by passenger trains running between Mangaluru and Subramanya road stations. The state highway 100 (SH-100) connecting Puttur to Kukke Subramanya passes through this village. There are frequent buses from Puttur to Kaniyooru to Kukke subhramanya.

Kaniyoor Matha
Shri Kaniyoor Matha is one among the eight Mathas (which are popularly known as Ashta Matha) established by Shri Madhvacharya. Shri Rama Theertha, a direct disciple of Shri Madhvacharya is  the first pontiff of Kaniyoor matha. Since then, there were 29 pontiffs who ably led Kaniyooru Matha and added to the glory of Matha. Shri Rama Theertha, the first pontiff of Kaniyoor Matha was given with idol of Shri Yoganarasimha, which is being worshipped with utmost respect and devotion as the main deity of Kaniyoor matha. At present Shri Vidyavallabha Theertha Swamiji is heading Kaniyoor Matha.

Guru Parampara of Kaniyoor Matha
 Sri Madhvacharya
 Sri Rama Teertha
 Sri Raghunatha Teertha
 Sri Raghupathi Teertha
 Sri Raghunandana Teertha
 Sri Yadunandana Teertha
 Sri Vishvanatha Teertha
 Sri Vedagarbha Teertha
 Sri Vageesha Teertha
 Sri Varadapathi Teertha
 Sri Vishwapathi Teertha
 Sri Vishwamoorthi Teertha
 Sri Vedapathi Teertha
 Sri Vedaraja Teertha
 Sri Vidyadheesha Teertha
 Sri Vibhudesha Teertha
 Sri Varijaksha Teertha
 Sri Vishwendra Teertha
 Sri Vibhudavandya Teertha
 Sri Vibhudadhiraja Teertha
 Sri Vidyaraja Teertha
 Sri Vibhudapriya Teertha
 Sri Vidyasagara Teertha
 Sri Vasudeva Teertha
 Sri Vidyapathi Teertha
 Sri Vamana Teertha
 Sri Vidyanidhi Teertha
 Sri Vidyasamudra Teertha
 Sri Vidyavarinidhi Teertha
 Sri Vidyavallabha Teertha(Present Pontiff)

See also
Kaniyur, Tamil Nadu
Kaniyur, Coimbatore

External links
Sri Kaniyooru Matha, the official site
www.udupipages.com

Ashta Mathas of Udupi
Hindu monasteries in India
Villages in Dakshina Kannada district